Pleasant Run may refer to the following places in the United States:

 Pleasant Run, Ohio, a census-designated place in Hamilton County
 Pleasant Run Elementary School, a public school in Lancaster, Texas
 Pleasant Run Township, Lawrence County, Indiana
 Pleasant Run Village, a former village in Readington Township, New Jersey
 Pleasant Run (New Jersey), a brook in central New Jersey
 Pleasant Run, West Virginia
 Pleasant Run Greenway, a recreational trail in Indianapolis, Indiana

Other uses
 Pleasant Run (painting), a painting by T. C. Steele